In computing, terascale may refer to

 Intel Tera-Scale
 AMD TeraScale (microarchitecture)

See also petascale computing.